Michael Carr (24 June 1933 – 29 September 1995) was an English cricketer. He played one first-class match for Cambridge University Cricket Club in 1953.

See also
 List of Cambridge University Cricket Club players

References

External links
 

1933 births
1995 deaths
English cricketers
Cambridge University cricketers
Sportspeople from Alexandria